James Rennie may refer to:
James Rennie (naturalist) (1787–1867), Scottish naturalist
James Rennie (actor) (1889–1965), Canadian-American actor
James Rennie (golfer) (1826–1924), Scottish golfer
James Rennie (Under the Dome), fictional character in Under the Dome
James Rennie, Junior, fictional character in Under the Dome